Theodore John Stevenson is a British actor who as a child rose to fame for portraying Horrid Henry in Horrid Henry: The Movie and as Craig in the family sitcoms Millie Inbetween and Flatmates, and Toby in the sci-fi drama Humans.

Career
In 2007, Stevenson became an actor and took his first film role in Fred Claus as Young Nicolaus. He then appeared in the black comedy In Bruges in 2008. In 2010, he starred in Reuniting the Rubins where he played the role of Jake Rubins. In 2011, he took on his best-known role as Horrid Henry in Horrid Henry: The Movie where he worked alongside Tyger Drew-Honey and Anjelica Huston. He also appeared in the film's music video and appeared on Daybreak in late 2011.
 
A year after Horrid Henry: The Movie, Vertigo Films announced that Stevenson would star in an upcoming secondary school version of Streetdance called Streetdance Juniors which was renamed All Stars in June 2012, releasing on 3 May 2013. He stars alongside Akai Osei, Ashley Jensen, Kimberley Walsh and John Barrowman amongst others.

From 2014 to 2017, Stevenson had a main role in Millie Inbetween, a CBBC comedy-drama, playing the role of the main character Millie's stepbrother.

From 2015 to 2018, Stevenson had a main role as Toby Hawkins in the drama Humans where he has a crush on his family's synth, Anita.

Filmography

References

External links
 

Living people
21st-century English male actors
English male child actors
English male film actors
English male television actors
Male actors from Oxfordshire
People from Banbury
British expatriates in the United States
Year of birth missing (living people)